Juan Carlos Cabrera (born 9 November 1991) is a Mexican competitive rower.

He competed at the 2016 Summer Olympics in Rio de Janeiro, in the men's single sculls.

References

External links

1991 births
Living people
Mexican male rowers
Olympic rowers of Mexico
Rowers at the 2016 Summer Olympics
Pan American Games medalists in rowing
Pan American Games silver medalists for Mexico
Rowers at the 2019 Pan American Games
Medalists at the 2019 Pan American Games
20th-century Mexican people
21st-century Mexican people